The New England Intensity was an American football team in the Independent Women's Football League based in Medway, Massachusetts. Home games were played at Joseph P. Hanlon Field on the campus of Medway High School in Medway.

For its first season, in 2003, the Intensity was known as the Rhode Island Riptide. Games were played at Pierce Field in East Providence, Rhode Island. The following two seasons the team was known as the Rhode Island Intensity. The team moved to Medway, going by the "New England" locale name, the Intensity played in the Women's Professional Football League before going back to the IWFL the following year.

The team appears to have folded after the 2013 season.

Season-by-season 

|-
| colspan="6" align="center" | Rhode Island Intensity (IWFL)
|-
|2004 || 3 || 4 || 0 || X-Team || --
|-
|2005 || 1 || 9 || 0 || 5th East Mid-Atlantic || --
|-
| colspan="6" align="center" | New England Intensity (WPFL)
|-
|2006 || 7 || 1 || 0 || 1st American East || Lost American Conference Qualifier (So Cal)
|-
| colspan="6" align="center" | New England Intensity (IWFL)
|-
|2007 || 3 || 5 || 0 || 3rd East North Atlantic || --
|-
|2008 || 5 || 3 || 0 || 2nd Tier II North Atlantic || Lost Tier II Semifinal (Clarksville)
|-
|2009 || 6 || 2 || 0 || 5th Tier II || Lost Tier II Quarterfinal (Jersey)
|-
|2010 || 8 || 1 || 0 || 3rd II East Northeast || --
|-
|2011 || 7 || 4 || 0 || 2nd East North Atlantic || Won Tier II Quarterfinal (Baltimore) || 
|-
!Totals || 40 || 29 || 0
|colspan="2"| (including playoffs)

Season schedules

2009

2010

References

External links 
 
 

2004 establishments in Massachusetts
2013 disestablishments in Massachusetts
American football teams in Massachusetts
American football teams established in 2004
American football teams disestablished in 2013
Defunct sports teams in Massachusetts
Independent Women's Football League
Sports in Norfolk County, Massachusetts
Women's sports in Massachusetts
Medway, Massachusetts